(), also known as  (in Kyoto and Kanazawa) or , are a class of female Japanese performing artists and entertainers trained in traditional Japanese performing arts styles, such as dance, music and singing, as well as being proficient conversationalists and hosts. Their distinct appearance is characterised by long, trailing kimono, traditional hairstyles and  make-up.

Modern geisha are not prostitutes. This misconception originated from conflating Japanese courtesans,  reenactors, the extant , and prostitutes, who historically also wore kimono. The first female geisha appeared in 1751, with geisha before that time being male performers who entertained guests within the pleasure quarters; only later did the profession become mainly characterised by female workers.

The arts that geisha perform are considered highly developed and, in some cases, unique throughout Japan to the world of geisha. For example, the Gion district of Kyoto is the only district wherein the  style of Japanese traditional dance is taught. This style of dance is taught solely to the geisha within the district by the Inoue school, with the school's former head, Inoue Yachiyo, having been classified as a "Living National Treasure" by the Government of Japan, the highest artistic award attainable in the country, in 1955.

Etymology and terminology

A number of terms are used to describe the profession and community that geisha both live and work in.

History

Origins
In the early stages of Japanese history,  (serving girls) were mostly wandering girls whose families had been displaced by war. Some of these  girls offered sexual services for money while others with a better education made a living by entertaining at high-class social gatherings.

After the imperial court moved the capital to Heian-kyō (Kyoto) in 794, aspects of now-traditional Japanese art forms and aesthetic ideals began to develop, which would later contribute to the conditions under which the geisha profession emerged. Skilled female performers, such as  dancers, thrived under the Imperial court, creating the traditions of female dance and performance that would later lead to both the development of geisha and kabuki actors.

During the Heian period, ideals surrounding relationships with women, sexual or otherwise, did not emphasise fidelity, with marriage within the Heian court considered a relatively casual arrangement. Men were not constrained to be faithful to their wives, with the ideal wife instead being a modest mother who managed the affairs of the house, following Confucian customs wherein love had secondary importance to the other roles a wife fulfilled within the marriage. As such, courtesans—who provided not only sexual enjoyment, but also romantic attachment and artistic entertainment—were seen both as an outlet for men and as common companions. Though geisha would not appear until the 1800s, the role and status of courtesans as artistic and romantic entertainers were a tradition that geisha came to inherit, with the basic artforms of entertaining guests through song, dance and conversation being employed and adapted to contemporary tastes by geisha.

Though women in the lower ranks of  did not provide as much artistic entertainment as they did sexual, whilst still prostitutes, also included the traditional arts as a key aspect of their entertainment, their practice of which differed considerably from those of geisha. As  were considered to be low-ranking members of the nobility, the instruments they played and the songs they sang were often confined to those considered "respectable" enough for the upper classes.

However, some  also performed theatrical plays, dances and skits; one such person was Izumo no Okuni, whose theatrical performances on the dry riverbed of the Kamo River are considered to be the beginnings of kabuki theatre.

18th-century emergence of the geisha

Following their inception by the shogunate in the 17th century, the pleasure quarters quickly became popular entertainment centres that developed their own additional forms of entertainment outside of sex. The highly accomplished courtesans of these districts entertained their clients by dancing, singing, and playing music. Some were renowned poets and calligraphers as well; the development of the cultural arts of the pleasure quarters led to the rise in  being considered to be the celebrities of their day.

Around the turn of the 18th century, the first geisha, or forerunners of geisha, performing for guests of the pleasure quarters began to appear; these entertainers, who provided song and dance, developed from a number of sources. Some geisha, who were something of travelling entertainers going from party to party, were men, who would entertain the customers of courtesans through song and dance. At the same time, the forerunners of female geisha, the teenage , developed, trained and hired as chaste dancers-for-hire within these pleasure quarters. Further still, some courtesans, whose contracts within the pleasure quarters had ended, chose to stay on to provide musical entertainment to guests, making use of the skills they had formerly developed as part of their job.

In the 1680s,  had become popular entertainers and were often paid to perform in the private homes of upper-class samurai; by the early 18th century, many of these  had also begun offering sexual services as well as chaste performances. Performers who were no longer teenagers (and could no longer style themselves ) adopted other titles in order to continue working – with one being "geisha", after the male entertainers of the time.

The first woman known to have called herself "geisha" was a prostitute from Fukagawa, roughly around 1750, who had become a skilled singer and  player. The geisha, who took the name of Kikuya, became an immediate success, bringing greater popularity to the idea of female geisha. In the next two decades, female geisha became well known for their talents as entertainers in their own right; these performers often worked in the same establishments as male geisha.

Geisha in the 19th century to present day

By 1800, the profession of geisha was understood to be almost entirely female, and was established as a distinct role in its own right; however, geisha were, throughout various points within the Edo period, unable to work outside of the pleasure quarters, being affected by reforms aimed at either limiting or shutting down the pleasure quarters. These reforms were often inconsistent, and were repealed at various times.

Once established as an independent profession, a number of edicts were then introduced in order to protect the business of courtesans and separate the two professions. Geisha were firstly forbidden from selling sex, though many continued to do so; if a courtesan accused a geisha of stealing her customers and business of sex and entertainment, an official investigation was opened, with the potential for a geisha to lose her right to practice the profession. Geisha were also forbidden from wearing particularly flashy hairpins or kimono, both of which were hallmarks of higher-ranking courtesans, who were considered to be a part of the upper classes.

Despite their official status as lower-class entertainers, geisha continued to grow in popularity. While courtesans existed to meet the needs of upper-class men (who could not respectably be seen to visit a lower-class prostitute) and prostitutes met the sexual needs of lower-class men, this left a gap of skilled and refined entertainers for the emerging merchant classes, who, though wealthy, were unable to access courtesans because of their social class. The status of courtesans as celebrities and arbiters of fashion had also waned considerably; the art forms they practiced had become stiffly-cherished relics of the upper classes, as had their manner of speech and their increasingly gaudy appearance. In contrast,  had begun to successfully establish themselves as worldly, cutting-edge entertainers, more artistically daring than their cloistered, indentured cousins, and able to come and go and dress as they pleased.

This popularity was then increased by the introduction of various laws intended to clamp down on and regulate the lower classes – in particular, the emerging merchant classes who had established themselves as the premiere patrons of geisha. Both had, over time, come to hold much of the purchasing power within Japan, with their status as lower class allowing them a degree of freedom in their tastes of dress and entertainment, in contrast to upper class families who had little choice but to appear in a manner deemed respectable to their status.

As the tastes of the merchant classes for kabuki and geisha became widely popular, laws introduced to effectively neuter the appearances and tastes of geisha and their customers were passed. This, however, had the adverse effect of leading to the rise in popularity of more refined and subversive aesthetical senses within those classes, further alienating courtesans and their patrons from popularity and contemporary taste; the introduction of laws on dress only furthered the popularity of geisha as refined and fashionable companions for men. As a result, over time, courtesans of both higher and lower ranks began to fall out of fashion, seen as gaudy and old-fashioned.

By the 1830s, geisha were considered to be the premiere fashion and style icons in Japanese society, and were emulated by women of the time.

There were considered to be many classifications and ranks of geisha, though some were colloquial or closer to a tongue-in-cheek nicknames than an official ranking.

By the end of the 19th century, courtesans no longer held the celebrity status they once did.

This trend would continue until the criminalisation of prostitution in Japan in 1956.

Pre-war and wartime geisha

Though geisha returned to the  relatively quickly after the war, many had decided to stay on in their wartime jobs, considering it to be a more stable form of employment. Both during and after the war, the geisha name lost some status, as some prostitutes began referring to themselves as "geisha girls" to members of the American military occupying Japan.

Post-war geisha
In 1945, the  saw restrictions on its practices lifted with teahouses, bars, and geisha houses allowed to open again. Though many geisha did not return to the  after the war, it was evident that working as a geisha was still considered to be a lucrative and viable career, with numbers increasing quickly. The vast majority of geisha after the war were aged 20–24, as many retired in their mid-twenties after finding a patron – a trend carried over from the pre-war :

I showed the mother of the Yamabuki [, in 1975] some statistics on the age distribution of the geisha population in the 1920s. She remarked on the big dip in figures when women reached the age of twenty-five. "In those days, when you found yourself a patron you could stop working. If you were lucky you would be set up in your own apartment and have a life of leisure, taking lessons when you wanted to for your own enjoyment[...] I think it's pretty unusual nowadays for a geisha to stop working when she gets a patron."

The status of geisha in Japanese society also changed drastically after the war. Throughout the 1920s and 1930s, much discussion had taken place surrounding the status of geisha in a rapidly-Westernising Japanese society. Some geisha had begun to experiment with wearing Western clothing to engagements, learning Western-style dancing, and serving cocktails to customers instead of sake. The image of a "modern" pre-war geisha had been viewed by some as unprofessional and a betrayal of the profession's image, but as a necessary change and an obvious evolution by others. However, the incumbent pressures of the war rapidly turned the tide against Westernisation, leading to an effective abandonment of most radical "Western-style" geisha experiments.

After the war, geisha unanimously returned to wearing kimono and practicing the traditional arts, abandoning all experimental geisha styles of appearance and entertainment. This, however, led to the final blow for the profession's reputation as fashionable in wider society; though the geisha did not experience the rapid decline and eventual death that courtesans had experienced in the previous century, they were instead rendered as "protectors of tradition" in favour of preserving the image geisha had cultivated over time.

Nonetheless, in the decades after the war, the profession's practices still underwent some changes. Despite this, the misconception of geisha being on some level prostitutes and of  being a common practice continues, inaccurately, to this day.

After Japan lost the war, geisha dispersed and the profession was in shambles. When they regrouped during the Occupation and began to flourish in the 1960s during Japan's postwar economic boom, the geisha world changed. In modern Japan, girls are not sold into indentured service. Nowadays, a geisha's sex life is her private affair.

From the 1930s onwards, the rise of the  bar hostess began to overshadow geisha as the premiere profession of entertainment at parties and outings for men. In 1959, the Standard-Examiner reported the plight of geisha in an article written for the magazine  by Japanese businessman Tsûsai Sugawara. Sugawara stated that girls now "prefer[red] to become dancers, models, and cabaret and bar hostesses rather than start [the] training in music and dancing at the age of seven or eight" necessary to become geisha at the time.

Compulsory education laws passed in the 1960s effectively shortened the period of training for geisha apprentices, as girls could no longer be taken on at a young age to be trained throughout their teenage years. This led to a decline in women entering the profession, as most  required a recruit to be at least somewhat competent and trained in the arts she would later go on to use as a geisha; by about 1975,  mothers in Kyoto began accepting both recruits from different areas of Japan in larger numbers, and recruits with little to no previous experience in the traditional arts.

By 1975, the average age of a geisha in the  district of Kyoto was roughly 39, with the vast majority being aged 35–49. The population of geisha at this time was also surprisingly high, roughly equivalent to the numbers of young women within the profession; geisha no longer retired young when they found a patron, and were less likely than other women of the same age to have both children and an extended family to support them. In 1989, it was reported in the New York Times that there were an estimated 600-700 geisha left throughout the whole of Japan.

Present-day geisha

Modern geisha mostly still live in  they are affiliated with, particularly during their apprenticeship, and are legally required to be registered to one, though they may not live there every day. Many experienced geisha are successful enough to choose to live independently, though living independently is more common in some geisha districts – such as those in Tokyo – than others.

Geisha are often hired to attend parties and gatherings, traditionally at tea houses or traditional Japanese restaurants.

Over time the number of geisha has declined, despite the efforts of those within the profession.

[Geisha] Satsuki first took an interest in the  while a middle school student in Osaka, at around the age of 14, after seeing a documentary about a 's training.

In recent years, a growing number of geisha have complained to the authorities about being pursued and harassed by groups of tourists keen to take their photograph when out walking.

Appearance

A geisha's appearance changes symbolically throughout her career, representing her training and seniority. Apprentice geisha typically appear in one style of dress, the most formal, the entire time they are working: a long-sleeved kimono with a trailing skirt, a formal  which may be extremely long, full white makeup and a traditional hairstyle, which is done using the apprentice's own hair.

Though apprentice geisha appear in their most formal dress when attending engagements all of the time, this appearance is not static, and the seniority of apprentices can generally be distinguished visually by changes to makeup, hairstyle and hair accessories.

Changes, and style of appearance, vary depending on the region of Japan a geisha or apprentice geisha works in; however, there is a general progression of appearance that can be seen as applicable to all geisha.

Makeup

Younger apprentices may also paint their eyebrows slightly shorter or rounder to emphasise a youthful appearance.  wear noticeably more blush – known as  – than geisha. Young apprentices may have the mother of the house or their "older sister" mentors help them apply makeup.

For a short period before becoming a geisha,  in some geisha districts colour their teeth black, usually accompanied by wearing the  hairstyle and a decorated black formal kimono. Teeth blackening was once a common practice amongst married women in Japan and the imperial court in earlier times, but is now an extremely uncommon practice.

Dress

Geisha and  always wear kimono while working, and typically wear kimono outside of work. However, the type of kimono varies based on age, occasion, region and season of the year.

Both  and geisha wear the collar on their kimono relatively far back, accentuating (for ) the red collar of the underkimono, and displaying (for both  and geisha) the two or three stripes of bare skin ( and  respectively) left just underneath the hairline when wearing .

These kimono feature a collar set further back into the neck, and sleeves attached unevenly to the body of the kimono. These features allow the collar to be pulled further down the back when worn, with the sleeves – which, like all women's kimono, feature an open portion underneath the shoulder – offset on the shoulder to ensure that the underarm is not exposed awkwardly through the open inner side of the sleeve.

 are formal kimono, and are almost invariably made of fine silk. For extremely formal occasions, black  that resemble  are seen.

When off-duty, if wearing kimono, both geisha and their apprentices wear regular, non-trailing kimono.

 wear  with -style sleeves, with a tuck sewn into either sleeve, and a tuck sewn into each shoulder. These tucks are holdovers from a time when  spent most of their teenage years as apprentices; the tucks would be let out as they grew. These tucks are still seen on some children's kimono.

 tend to be colourful and highly decorated, often featuring a design that continues inside the kimono's hem. The style of this kimono varies throughout different regions; apprentices in Kyoto tend to wear large but sparsely-placed motifs, whereas apprentices elsewhere appear in kimono similar to a regular , with small, busy patterns that cover a greater area. Unlike geisha, who almost invariably own the kimono they wear to engagements, apprentice geisha tend not to own their own kimono, and instead borrow those of their . This is because brand-new formal  are extremely expensive, and are unlikely to be something an apprentice can afford. An apprentice may also decide not to become a geisha and drop out, leaving them with an expensive piece of clothing their  cannot use for its other apprentices. As such, many  have several kimono and  used by their apprentices that have been used for several years, and some are known for their distinctive designs.

Apprentices wear long, formal .

Geisha
Geisha wear kimono more subdued in pattern and colour than both regular women's kimono, and the kimono worn by apprentice geisha. Geisha always wear short-sleeved kimono, even if they are technically still young enough to wear , as the wearing of -style sleeves is considered a marker of apprenticeship.

Not all geisha wear ; older geisha tend to wear regular formal kimono to engagements, with no trailing skirt or deep-set collar. The appearance of regional geisha varies less across Japan so than that of apprentice geisha.

Though geisha may wear  in the summer months, geisha from Fukuoka – where the fabric originates from – may wear it the entire year.

Geisha exclusively wear solid white , and wear either  or  when wearing kimono.

Hair

The hairstyles of geisha have varied throughout history. When the profession of geisha first came into existence, dress edicts prevented geisha from wearing the dramatic hairstyles worn by courtesans, leading to the subdued nature of most geisha hairstyles.

Geisha, unable to reliably book in with a hairstylist once a week to maintain their hair, began to wear human hair wigs in the  style that required restyling far less.

There are five different hairstyles that a  wears, which mark the different stages of her apprenticeship.

In the present day, geisha wear a variety of the  known as the  – a flattened, sleeker version of the  worn as a bridal wig in traditional weddings. Though geisha also wear this hairstyle as a wig, it is usually shaped specifically to their face by a wig stylist.

The style and colour of hair accessories worn with some  hairstyles can signify the stage of an apprentice's training. Typical combs and hairpins may be made of tortoiseshell or mock-tortoiseshell, gold, silver and semi-precious stones such as jade and coral.

Traditional performances

Geisha entertain their guests with a combination of both their hostessing and conversational skills, and their skills in traditional Japanese art forms of dance, music and singing. Before deciding to begin a career as a geisha, new recruits are generally expected to have an interest in the arts, as well as some experience; however, as geisha numbers have fallen throughout the decades, this is no longer a strict prerequisite. Some  will take on recruits with no previous experience, with some young geisha, despite having existing experience, expected to begin their lessons from the beginning.

The style of dance practiced by geisha today evolved from dance styles used in both  and kabuki theatre. Over time, the more exaggerated theatrical styles evolved into the subtle and more stylised form of dancing used today; despite the difference, elements of traditional Japanese dance, such as the use of gestures to tell a story and the symbolism used to represent this, run throughout both as a common feature.

These dances are accompanied by traditional Japanese music. The  soon became the mainstay instrument of geisha entertainment in the 1750s. It is described as having a distinct and melancholic sound, with traditional  music using only minor thirds and sixths in its composition.

Geisha who pursue musicianship are known as  geisha, whereas geisha who pursue dance are known as  geisha. Some geisha not only dance and play music, but also write poems, paint pictures, or compose music.

Public performances
While traditionally geisha led a cloistered existence, in recent years they have become more publicly visible, and entertainment is available without requiring the traditional introduction and connections.

All the Kyoto  hold these annually (mostly in spring, with one exclusively in autumn), dating to the Kyoto exhibition of 1872, and there are many performances, with tickets being inexpensive, ranging from around ￥1500 to ￥4500 – top-price tickets also include an optional tea ceremony (tea and  served by ) before the performance. Other  also hold public dances, including some in Tokyo, but have fewer performances.

At the Kitano Tenman-gū shrine there is an annual  during the  every February 25. , they also serve beer in a beer garden at the Kamishichiken Kaburenjo Theatre during the summer months. Another geisha beer garden is available at the Gion Shinmonso  in the Gion district. These beer gardens also feature traditional dances by the geisha in the evenings.

Training process

Before the 20th century, geisha began their training at a young age, around the age of six. In the present day this is no longer the case, and geisha usually debut as  around the age of 17 or 18. Labour laws stipulate that apprentices only join an  aged 18, although  in Kyoto are legally allowed to take on recruits at a younger age, 15–17. Now, girls must graduate from middle school and then make the personal decision to train to become a geisha. Young women who wish to become geisha now most often begin their training after high school or even college. Many more women begin their careers in adulthood.

Apprentices also learn how to comfortably wear kimono.

Traditionally the  stage of training lasted for years, and some girls were bonded to geisha houses as children. Successors, however, were not always blood relations.

A  is an apprentice and is therefore bonded under a contract to her . The  will usually supply her with food, board, kimono, and other tools of her trade, but a  may decide to fund everything herself from the beginning with either a loan or the help of an outside guarantor. This repayment may continue after graduation to geishahood, and only when her debts are settled can a geisha claim her entire wages and work independently (if loaning from the ).

In this way, a trainee gains insights into the nature of the job, following the typical nature of traditional arts apprenticeships in Japan, wherein an apprentice is expected to learn almost entirely through observation. Although geisha at the stage of  training will attend parties, they will not participate on an involved level and are instead expected to sit quietly. The  stage of training involves learning techniques of conversation, typical party games, and proper decorum and behaviour at banquets and parties. This stage lasts only about a month or so.

This stage can last between three and five years. During this time, they learn from both other trainees senior to them, and their geisha mentors, with special emphasis placed on learning from her symbolic "older sister". This involves learning how to serve drinks, hold casual conversation, and some training in the arts, though the latter is usually carried out through by dance and music teachers.

There are three major elements of a 's training. The first is the formal arts training, which takes place in schools found in every . The second element is the entertainment training which a trainee learns at various tea houses and parties by observing her "older sister".

Following debut, geisha typically do not go through major role changes, as there are no more formal stages of training. However, geisha can and do work into their eighties and nineties, and are still expected to train regularly, though lessons may only be put on a few times a month.

Non-Japanese geisha
Since the 1970s, non-Japanese have also trained as and become geisha. Liza Dalby, an American national, worked briefly with geisha in the Pontochō district of Kyoto as part of her doctorate research, although she did not formally debut as a geisha herself.

Some foreign nationals who have completed training and worked as geisha in Japan include:

Fukutarō – (Isabella), a Romanian national who worked in the Izu-Nagaoka district of Shizuoka Prefecture. She began her apprenticeship in April 2010 and debuted a year later in 2011.
Ibu – (Eve), a geisha of Ukrainian descent working in the Anjō district of Aichi Prefecture. Ibu first became interested in being a geisha in 2000, after visiting Japan for a year to study traditional dance, and came back 7 years later to become a geisha. Ibu debuted as a member of the Ichikoma  on 5 October 2010, and was still working as a geisha as of early 2012. She is reported as retired in 2016.
Juri – (Maria), a Peruvian geisha working in the resort town of Yugawara in the Kanagawa Prefecture.
Kimicho – (Sydney Stephens), an American national who worked as a geisha in the Shinagawa district of Tokyo. Stephens debuted in August 2015, but left the profession in 2017 for personal reasons.
Rinka – (Zhang Xue), a Chinese national from Shenyang, who became a geisha in Shimoda in the Shizuoka Prefecture in September 2011.
Sayuki – (Fiona Graham), an Australian geisha trainee who debuted in the Asakusa district of Tokyo in 2007 as the first registered foreign geisha in Japan. In February 2011, she left the Asakusa Geisha Association, and reestablished a geisha house in the historic Fukagawa district.

Geisha in Japanese society
Geisha are regarded in wider Japanese society as some of the most successful businesswomen in Japan, with almost the entirety of the  being owned and run by women. New geisha are trained for the most part by their symbolic mothers and older sisters, and engagements are arranged through the mother of the house.
The heads of some dance and music schools that geisha train under may also be male, with some barrier to entry for women to achieve the legacy of being the head of an artistic school.

Historically, the majority of women within Japan were wives whose familial duties kept them from working outside their homes. A geisha, however, could achieve independence by working to pay off her debts, making the profession one method for women to support themselves without becoming a wife. Moreover, a geisha chosen as the heir of a geisha house would have stable employment for much of her life, running the  throughout her career until the next generation.

Over time, some Japanese feminists have seen geisha as exploited women, but some modern geisha see themselves as liberated feminists: "We find our own way, without doing family responsibilities. Isn't that what feminists are?"

Geisha and male guests

Historically, geisha held an appeal for mainly male guests as a woman outside of the role of "wife". Wives were modest, responsible, and at times sombre, whereas geisha could be playful and carefree. Geisha would, on occasion, marry their clients, but this required retirement.

Though relatively uncommon in previous decades, geisha parties are no longer understood to be affairs for male guests exclusively, with women commonly attending parties alongside other male guests. Though geisha will still gracefully flirt and entertain male guests, this is understood to be a part of a geisha's hostessing and entertainment skills, and is not taken as a serious sign of personal interest.

Geisha and relationships
Despite long-held connotations between sex and geisha, a geisha's sex and love life is usually distinct from her professional life.

Most geisha are single women, though they may have lovers or boyfriends over time, and are allowed to pursue these relationships outside of having a patron. In the present day, some geisha are married and continue to work in their capacity as geisha, despite it being uncommon; these geisha are likely to be based in regions outside of Kyoto, as its heavily traditionalist geisha districts would be unlikely to allow a married geisha to work.

Geisha and prostitution
Geisha have historically been conflated with prostitution and commonly confused with prostitutes, despite the profession being mostly forbidden from receiving payment for sex since its inception. Despite this, some geisha have historically engaged in prostitution, either through personal choice, or through coercion and at times force.

In 1872, shortly after the Meiji Restoration, the new government passed a law liberating "prostitutes and geisha", ambiguously grouping both professions together. The terms of the law caused controversy from the unclear differentiation between professions, with some officials claiming that prostitutes and geisha worked different ends of the same profession, and that there would be little difference in calling all prostitutes "geisha". Nonetheless, the government maintained an official distinction between both professions, arguing that geisha should not be conflated with or confused for prostitutes.

Though the law officially maintained a distance between geisha and prostitutes, some geisha still engaged in prostitution. Writing in 1956, former geisha Sayo Masuda wrote of her experiences in the  town of Suwa, Nagano Prefecture, where she was sold for her virginity a number of times by the mother of her . Such practices could be common in less reputable geisha districts, with  towns in particular being known for their so-called "double registered" geisha (a term for an entertainer registered as both a geisha and a prostitute). A geisha working to pay off her incumbent debts to the mother of the house often had little choice but to engage in prostitution, whether forced to by her occupational "mother", or coerced to do it in order to pay off her debts.

In the present day,  does not exist, and apprentices mark their graduation to geisha status with a series of ceremonies and events.

Despite this, the modern conflation between geisha and prostitutes continues as a pervasive idea, particularly in Western culture. Sheridan Prasso wrote that Americans had "an incorrect impression of the real geisha world[...] geisha means 'arts person' trained in music and dance, not in the art of sexual pleasure". Similarly, K.G. Henshall stated that the job of a geisha included "[entertaining] their customer, be it by dancing, reciting verse, playing musical instruments, or engaging in light conversation. Geisha engagements may include flirting with men and playful innuendos; however, clients know that nothing more can be expected. In a social style that is common in Japan, men are amused by the illusion of that which is never to be."

partnership

Nonetheless, it was still common for geisha to retire from the profession in their mid-twenties to live off the support of their patron following the Second World War. The practice continues today, though geisha do not take  anywhere as commonly, and though intimacy in a  partnership was in previous decades not seen as essential, in modern times it is valued to a much greater degree because of the formal nature of the commitment and the awareness by both parties of how expensive it can be. The taking of a patron by a geisha is the closest thing to paid compensation for a personal partnership – whatever that partnership might entail – that a geisha officially engages in today.

"Geisha (Gee-sha) girls"
During the Allied occupation of Japan, some prostitutes, almost exclusively working for the occupying forces in Japan, began to advertise themselves as "geisha girls", partly because many foreign soldiers could not tell the difference between a geisha and a woman dressed in a kimono. These women came to be known commonly as "geesha girls", a misnomer originating from the language barrier between the armed forces and the prostitutes themselves; the term spread quickly, as evidenced by the fact that shortly after their arrival in 1945, it was said that some occupying American GIs congregated in Ginza and shouted "We want geesha girls!".

The English term "geisha girl" soon became a byword for any female Japanese prostitute, whether actually selling sex or not; the term was applied to bar hostesses (who occupy the role of entertaining men through conversation, not necessarily sex) and streetwalkers alike. The term "geisha girls", its quick spread to Western culture, and the accompanying mental image of a woman in a kimono offering sex and entertainment, is largely speculated as responsible for the continuing misconception in the West that all geisha are engaged in prostitution.

Unscrupulous  owners would not uncommonly sell an apprentice's virginity more than once to different customers, pocketing the entire fee for themselves with the apprentice herself remaining an apprentice.

During World War II, some prostitutes would use this term to refer to their acts with customers, leading to some confusion – particularly when referring to themselves as "geisha" when in the company of foreign soldiers, and sometimes amongst Japanese customers.

Geisha districts

Courtesans were said to be the "flowers" in this moniker for their showy and beautiful nature, with geisha being the "willows" for their understated nature.

Part of the comparison between geisha and willows comes from the perceived loyalty amongst geisha to their patronsover time, it became known that certain factions, such as certain political parties, would patronise some geisha districts with their rivals patronising others. Though courtesans (and by extension, prostitutes) were humorously known for having loyalty only to the customer paying them for the night, a geisha would stand by her patrons and defend their best interests, her loyalty to her patrons being perceived as higher than her loyalty to her money.

Historically, geisha on occasion were confined to operate in the same walled districts as courtesans and prostitutes; however, both professions have on some level always maintained a distance officially, despite often being legislated against by the same laws.

Tokyo
The Fukagawa district of Tokyo is known for being the location of the first female geisha in Japan; however, the area faced decline following WWII, with its registry office closing temporarily in the 1980s, before being partially revived in the mid- to late-2000s.

Within the Tokyo prefecture but outside of the city's 23 wards, the city of Hachiōji has its own geisha culture heritage.

Kyoto
The  in Kyoto are known for their adherence to tradition and high prestige, with the image of a Kyoto  typifying that of geisha culture within wider Japanese and international society.

In Kyoto, the different known as the are seen as unofficially ranked. Gion Kobu, Ponto-chō and Kamishichiken are seen as the most prestigious, with Gion Kobu at the top; below these three are Gion Higashi and Miyagawa-chō. The more prestigious  are frequented by powerful businessmen and politicians.

Niigata

The northern city of Niigata has its own geisha tradition, which dates to the Edo period. The Furumachi neighbourhoood is the place where most  are located, with places such as the Nabechaya.

The Niigata  are known for holding more flexible rules and traditions than other geisha districts in Japan, leading to the district's revival in the modern day, following a period of decline in the 1980s.

Regional 

Geisha in  towns such as Atami may also be seen as less prestigious, as geisha working in these towns are typically hired to work in one hotel for travelling customers they are usually not familiar with before entertaining; nevertheless, all geisha, regardless of region or district, are trained in the traditional arts, making the distinction of prestige one of history and tradition.

In popular culture
Geisha have been the subject of numerous films, books, and television shows.

Films about geisha

See also

References

Notes

Citations

Sources

Further reading

External links

 Nagoya Traditional Performing Arts Association
 WayBack Machine captures of the Immortal Geisha forum and website

 
1751 establishments in Japan
Gendered occupations
Japanese musicians
Society of Japan
Performing arts in Japan
Social history of Japan